Romanian–Serbian relations are foreign relations between Romania and Serbia. Both countries established diplomatic relations on April 19, 1841.

History
Although Serbia unofficially opened a kind of diplomatic agency in Bucharest in March 1836, officially, the first Serbian diplomatic agency in Bucharest was established in February 1863, with Kosta Magazinović, as its first diplomatic agent. Reciprocally the first Romanian diplomatic agency in Belgrade was established on 12/24 March 1863 and the first diplomatic agent was Teodor Calimachi.

In 1879, as a consequence of the independent state status, the diplomatic agencies from Belgrade and Bucharest became legations and the diplomatic agents, resident ministers. Thus on 14/26 April 1879 the Romanian diplomatic agency in Belgrade became legation, having Lascăr Catargiu as its first resident minister. In the summer of 1879 Milan A. Petronijević became Serbia's first resident minister in Romania. Later, after Romania and Serbia became kingdoms, in 1881 and 1882, their diplomatic representatives became "extraordinary envoy and plenipotentiary ministers". It was only in 1939 when the legations from Belgrade and Bucharest became embassies.

However, a gradual cut-off of international relations between Romania and Serbia (in that time Yugoslavia) happened in May 1941, after Romania recognized the independence of the German-controlled Independent State of Croatia, due to Romania being an Axis power at the time.

Nowadays, symbolizing the good relations between Romania and Serbia, there is in the former a sentence that says "Romania only has two friends: the Black Sea and Serbia". However, this phrase and the state of the relations between both has been disturbed by the Romanians in the Timok Valley in Serbia, where they are known in Serbian as "Vlachs", claiming a separate ethnic identity from the Romanians.

Embassies 

Romania has an embassy in Belgrade and a consulate-general in Vršac. Serbia has an embassy in Bucharest and a consulate-general in Timișoara.

Common memberships
Both countries are full members of the South-East European Cooperation Process, of the Stability Pact for South Eastern Europe, of the Central European Initiative, of the Southeast European Cooperative Initiative and of the Organization of the Black Sea Economic Cooperation, but, while Romania is a member state of the European Union, Serbia is not. Romania supports Serbia's bid to the European Union.

Both countries are strongly against 2008 Kosovo declaration of independence, with Romania strongly supporting Serbia's territorial integrity.

Serbs of Romania

The Serbs of Romania are a recognized ethnic minority. According to the 2011 census, there were 18,076 Serbs in Romania (~0.1%). Serbs mostly live in western Romania, in the Romanian part of the Banat region, where they constitute an absolute majority in two communes and a relative majority in one other.

Romanians of Serbia

The Romanians of Serbia are a recognized ethnic minority. According to the 2011 census, there were 29,332 Romanians in Serbia (~0.4%), while 35,330 people declared themselves "Vlachs". There are differing views among some of the "Vlachs" over whether or not they should be regarded as Romanians or as members of a distinctive nationality. Romanians and "Vlachs" mostly live in northeastern Serbia, in the Timok Valley and in the Serbian part of the Banat region to be exact, where they constitute a minority in two municipalities and in Vojvodina. Romanians of the Timok Valley have no schools where to practice their maternal language.

Diplomacy

Republic of Romania
Belgrade (Embassy)

Republic of Serbia
Bucharest (Embassy)

See also
 Foreign relations of Romania
 Foreign relations of Serbia 
 Accession of Serbia to the European Union
 Romania–Serbia border
 Romania's reaction to the 2008 Kosovo declaration of independence
 Romania–Yugoslavia relations

References

Further reading

External links
 Serbian Ministry of Foreign Affairs about relations with Romania
 Serbian embassy in Bucharest
 Serbian general consulate in Timișoara (in Romanian and Serbian only)
 Romanian-Serbian Relations (late 19th century – early 20th century)
 General Consulate of Romania in Vršac 

 
Serbia
Bilateral relations of Serbia